Chah Dadkhoda or Chah-e Dad Khoda may refer to:
 Chah Dadkhoda, Kerman
 Chah Dadkhoda, Sistan and Baluchestan
 Chah Dadkhoda District, in Kerman Province
 Chah Dadkhoda Rural District, in Kerman Province